The Ibiporã State Park is a  state park in the state of Paraná, Brazil.

Location

The Ibiporã State Park is in the municipality of Ibiporã, Paraná.
It lies to the northeast of the urban area, bounded by the cemetery of the Vila Ipê district to the southwest, the BR-369 highway to the south and the PR-862 road to the north.
The park is in the Tibagi River basin.

History

The Institute of Lands and Cartography of the State of Paraná (ITC) was to administer the park.
A planning document was prepared in 1988.
On 23 January 2012 Governor Carlos Alberto Richa changed the management category by decree 3741 to the federally defined "state park" category.
The Paraná Environment Institute (IAP) was responsible for administration.
A formal management plan was published in 2015.

Environment

The park protects an area of seasonal semi-deciduous forest in the Atlantic Forest biome.
The main families of trees in the region are Leguminosae, Meliaceae, Moraceae, Phytolaccaceae, Myrtaceae, Lauraceae, Euphorbiaceae, Rubiaceae, Rutaceae and Sapotaceae.
The forest also contains significant numbers of number of vascular epiphytes in the Orchidaceae, Polypodiaceae and Bromeliaceae families, particularly near to water courses and pools.
Fauna have not been well studied, but are assumed to consist mainly of species that are relatively insensitive to human activities.

Visiting

The park has a visitor center, parking, trails, huts, kiosks, toilets and drinking fountains.
There is a nursery for seedlings of various native species and a ranger's house.
Activities include scientific research, environmental education, and hiking.

Notes

Sources

State parks of Brazil
Protected areas established in 1980
1980 establishments in Brazil
Protected areas of Paraná (state)